The 2009 Baden Masters was the fifth time the Baden Masters curling event was held. It was held from September 11–13, 2009 and was the first even of the 2009-10 World Curling Tour season. Canada's Brad Gushue rink defeated Norway's Thomas Ulsrud rink in the final 6–3.

Competing Teams
 Alexander Attinger
 Mark Dacey
 Andrey Drozdov
 Thomas Dufour
 Niklas Edin
 Randy Ferbey
 Brad Gushue
 Pascal Hess
 Andy Kapp
 Stefan Karnusian
 Yusuke Morozumi
 David Murdoch
 Toni Müller
 Claudio Pescia
 Manuel Ruch
 David Sik
 Jiri Snitil
 Ralph Stöckli
 Thomas Ulsrud
 Patrick Vuille

Playoffs

References
WCT event page

Baden Masters, 2009
2009 in Swiss sport
Baden Masters